is a Japanese voice actor and singer affiliated with Arts Vision. He is best known for his roles on Cautious Hero: The Hero Is Overpowered but Overly Cautious as Seiya Ryuuguuin, Cute High Earth Defense Club Love! as En Yufuin, Mobile Suit Gundam: Iron-Blooded Orphans as Eugene Sevenstark, The Legend of the Galactic Heroes: Die Neue These - Kaikou as Siegfried Kircheis, Goblin Slayer as Goblin Slayer, JoJo's Bizarre Adventure: Stone Ocean as Weather Report, Black Clover as Mars and Mobile Suit Gundam Narrative as Zoltan Akkanen. At the 10th Seiyu Awards, he won the Best Rookie Actors Award for his role Kurō Hazama in Young Black Jack and Wakasa in Merman in My Tub.

Umehara provides vocals and guitar to the pop rock band Sir Vanity, a band he formed with Yoshiki Nakajima and two other musicians.

Personal life
On May 10, 2018, it was announced that Umehara was hospitalized due to an acute disseminated encephalomyelitis. On July 30, 2018, Arts Vision announced that he had recovered. Arts Vision also stated that while he was being treated in the hospital, Umehara had a complication of intracranial hypotension, but after medical treatment and rehabilitation, his doctors discharged him from the hospital with no worries about the effects.

Filmography

Anime
2014
Brynhildr in the Darkness (Math teacher, man A, student, man, police officer, worker, Hekusen'yakuto man)
Chaika - The Coffin Princess (Thug C)
Magimoji Rurumo (Urata)
Merman in My Tub (Wakasa)
Riddle Story of Devil (Student of the darts shop)
Wolf Girl and Black Prince (Student, clerk)
Yowamushi Pedal (Audience)

2015
Aquarion Logos (Hayato Kujō)
Cute High Earth Defense Club Love! (En Yufuin)
Gatchaman Crowds insight (Rhythm Suzuki)
Makura no Danshi (Ryūshi Theodore Emori)
Million Doll (Ryū-san)
Mobile Suit Gundam: Iron-Blooded Orphans (Eugene Sevenstark)
Pokémon: XY (Orunisu)
Seraph of the End: Vampire Reign (René Simm)
Seraph of the End: Battle in Nagoya (René Simm)
Shōnen Hollywood -Holly Stage for 50- (Friend)
Snow White with the Red Hair (Mitsuhide Lowen)
Young Black Jack (Kurō Hazama)

2016
Amanchu! (Makoto Ninomiya)
Battery (Kazuki Kaionji)
Cute High Earth Defense Club LOVE! LOVE! (En Yufuin)
Gate: Jieitai Kanochi nite, Kaku Tatakaeri - Enryuu-hen (Diabo)
Girlish Number (Gojou Karasuma)
Haruchika (College Student) (ep 10)
Magic★Kyun! Renaissance (Teika Ichijōji)
Snow White with the Red Hair 2nd Season (Mitsuhide Lowen)
Tiger Mask W (Fujii Takuma)
Trickster (Inoue Ryo)
Masamune Datenicle (3rd Lord Yoshihiro, Yoshihiro Date)

2017
Children of the Whales (Ouni)
Chiruran : Nibun no Ichi (Nagakura Shinpachi)
Classroom of the Elite (Manabu Horikita)
Dynamic Chord (Shinobu Kurosawa)
Ikemen Sengoku: Toki o Kakeru ga Koi wa Hajimaranai (Shingen Takeda)
Jūni Taisen (Ushii/Eiji Kashii)
Kabukibu! (Tonbo Murase)
Karada Sagashi (Sugimoto Kenji)
Kino's Journey -the Beautiful World- the Animated Series (Shizu)
A Polar Bear in Love (Polar Bear)
Rage of Bahamut: Virgin Soul (Charioce XVII)
Robomasters: The Animated Series (Tei)
Sengoku Night Blood (Masamune Date)
Star-Myu 2 (Ren Kitahara)
The IDOLM@STER SideM (Kyoji Takajo)
Tsukipro The Animation (Dai Murase )
Whistle! (ONA) (Ryoichi Tenjo)

2018
Amanchu! Advance (Makoto Ninomiya)
Asa Da Yo!Kaishain (Kaibura Kai)
Black Clover (Mars)
Caligula (Izuru Minezawa)
Captain Tsubasa (2018) (Ken Wakashimazu)
Dame×Prince (Vino von Ronzado)
Darling in the Franxx (Goro)
Gakuen Babysitters (Hayato Kamitani)
Gintama: Shirogane no Tamashii-hen (Enshou)
Goblin Slayer (Goblin Slayer)
Hakyū Hōshin Engi (Igo)
Last Hope (Jay Yoon)
The Legend of the Galactic Heroes: Die Neue These - Kaikou (Siegfried Kircheis)
Mobile Suit Gundam Narrative (Zoltan Akkanen)
Planet With (Hideo Torai)
Sword Gai The Animation (Ichijou Seiya)
Tada Never Falls in Love (Sugimoto Hajime)
The iDOLM@STER SideM: WakeAtte Mini! (Kyoji Takajo)
The Thousand Musketeers (Ieyasu)
Uchū no Hō: Reimei-hen (Alpha)

2019
Ace of Diamond Act II (Soiichiro Mima)
Ahiru no Sora (Shigenobu Yakuma)
Cautious Hero: The Hero Is Overpowered but Overly Cautious (Seiya Ryuuguuin)
Crayon Shin-chan (Ikemen)
Ensemble Stars! (Keito Hasumi)
Fire Force (Tōjō)
Fragtime (OVA) (TBA)
Kimi dake ni Motetainda (Shun Gotōda)
Meiji Tokyo Renka (Ozaki Kouyou )
One-Punch Man (Kuroi Sēshi) (Episode 22)
RobiHachi (Prince Chamechamecha) (Episode 7)
Stand My Heroes: Piece of Truth (Miyase Gou)
Star-Myu 3 (Ren Kitahara)
The Legend of the Galactic Heroes: Die Neue These - Seiran (Siegfried Kircheis)
Tsukipro The Animation 2nd Season (Dai Murase)
ZENONZARD The Animation (Ash Claude)

2020
Akudama Drive (Courier)
Ascendance of a Bookworm (Damuel Matthias)
Fruits Basket 2nd Season (Kureno Souma)
Goblin Slayer: Goblin's Crown (Goblin Slayer)
Golden Kamuy (Vasily)
Kapibara-san (Narrator, Zookeeper)
Plunderer (Jail Murdoch)
Shadowverse (Kiriyama Shirou)
Uchitama?! Have you seen my Tama? (Kuro Mikawa)
Woodpecker Detective's Office (Sakutarō Hagiwara)
Toilet-Bound Hanako-kun (Nene's secret crush/side character)

2021
2.43: Seiin High School Boys Volleyball Team (Misao Aoki)
Heaven's Design Team (Kimura)
Hetalia: World Stars (Portugal)
High-Rise Invasion (Sniper Mask)
Hortensia Saga (Defrost Danois)
I-Chu: Halfway Through the Idol (Lucas)
JoJo's Bizarre Adventure: Stone Ocean (Weather Report)
Let's Make a Mug Too (Tomonari Kusano)
My Hero Academia: World Heroes' Mission (Shidero)
Seven Knights Revolution: Hero Successor (Gales)
Skate-Leading Stars (Izumi Himekawa)
So I'm a Spider, So What? (Balto Phthalo)
SSSS.Dynazenon (Koyomi Yamanaka)
The Saint's Magic Power is Omnipotent (Erhart Hawke)
The Slime Diaries: That Time I Got Reincarnated as a Slime (Zegion)
Those Snow White Notes (Seiryū Kamiki)
Tsukipro The Animation 2nd Season (Dai Murase)
Words Bubble Up Like Soda Pop (Toughboy) 

2022
Aoashi (Haruhisa Kuribayashi)
Bleach: Thousand-Year Blood War (Jugram Haschwalt)
Build Divide -#FFFFFF- Code White (Arkeld)
Cap Kakumei Bottleman DX (Shiman Ijūin)
Classroom of the Elite 2nd Season (Manabu Horikita)
Echigo Bafuku (Sawatari)
I'm the Villainess, So I'm Taming the Final Boss (Claude Jean Ellmeyer)
Legend of Mana: The Teardrop Crystal (Elazul)
Miss Kuroitsu from the Monster Development Department (Professor Sadamaki)
My Master Has No Tail (Rakuda)
Play It Cool, Guys (Takayuki Mima)
Romantic Killer (Tsukasa Kazuki)
Shoot! Goal to the Future (Atsushi Kamiya)
Tales of Luminaria -The Fateful Crossroad- (August Wallenstein)
Tokyo Mew Mew New (Pie)
Golden Kamuy Season 4 (Vasily)
I've Somehow Gotten Stronger When I Improved My Farm-Related Skills (Volpe Dorma)

2023
Ayaka: A Story of Bonds and Wounds (Aka Ibuki)
Classroom of the Elite 3rd Season (Manabu Horikita)
Goblin Slayer II (Goblin Slayer)
Gridman Universe (Koyomi Yamanaka)
High Card (Vijay Kumar Singh)
Mashle (Abel Walker)
Opus Colors (Iori Haijima)
Revenger (Yuen Usui)
Spy Classroom (Klaus)
The Iceblade Sorcerer Shall Rule the World (Evi Armstrong)
The Misfit of Demon King Academy 2nd Season (Anos Voldigoad)
The Reincarnation of the Strongest Exorcist in Another World (Haruyoshi Kugano)
Tokyo Mew Mew New Season 2 (Pie)
Tsurune: The Linking Shot (Reiji Aragaki)
Why Raeliana Ended Up at the Duke's Mansion (Noah Voltaire Wynknight)

Game
2014
DYNAMIC CHORD feat. (reve parfait) (Shinobu Kurosawa)
IDOL-RISM (Ichido Haruna)
The IDOLM@STER SideM (Mobage) (Kyoji Takajo)
Ikemen Bakumatsu - Unmei no Koi (Sakamoto Ryoma)
Majo no Nina to Tsuchikare no Senshi
Senjou no Wedding
Tenku no Craft Fleet (Damien, Hauness, Reel)
 
2015
Ai ★ Chū (Lucas)
BELIEVER! (Inami You)
Cute High Earth Defense Club Love! Game! (Yufuin En)
Ensemble Stars! (Keito Hasumi)
Gakuen Club ~Houkago no Himitsu~ (Kimiki Renji)
I DOLL U (Peter
The IDOLM@STER SideM (Kyoji Takajo)
Ikémen Sengoku: Romances Across Time (Takeda Shingen)
Seraph of the End: Unmei no Hajimari (Rene Simm)

2016
Band Yarouze! (Shin Koganei)
DAMEXPRINCE (Vino von Ronzado)
Do s ni Koishite ~Suiteroom de Himitsu no Shihai~ (Kokonoe Naoki)
Icchibanketsu (Takemi Kazuchi)
Magic★Kyun! Renaissance (Teika Ichijoji)
Period Cube ~Torikago no Amadeus~ (Demento)
Toraware no Palm (Haruto Kisaragi)
The Caligula Effect (Izuru Minezawa)
Hortensia Saga: Ao no Kishidan (Defrost)

2017
Akane-sasu Sekai de Kimi to Utau (Ono no Imoko)
Kingdom Hearts HD 2.8 Final Chapter Prologue (Ira)
Hana Oboro: Sengoku-den Ranki (Hashiba Hideyoshi)
The IDOLM@STER SideM LIVE ON ST@GE! (Kyoji Takajo)
Sengoku Night Blood (Masamune Date)
SENSIL (Sakuraba Shion)
Shiro to Kuro no Alice (Rain)
White Cat Project (Liam)
Gakuen Club ~ Himitsu no Nightclub ~ PSVita (Kamiki Renji)
Dear my Magicalboys (Niki Mugendo)
Kimi to Kiri no Labyrinth (Hishikawa Hodaka)
Grand Summoners (Vox)

2018
Majestic ☆ Majolical (Jasper Beryl)
Shiro to Kuro no Alice -Twilight Line- (Rain)
Senjyushi: The Thousand Noble Musketeers (Ieyasu)
Servant of Thrones (Phiet Crestan)
Caligula Overdoes (Izuru Minezawa)
Dream Collection ~Mukanshu~ (Seika)
Dynamic Chord JAM&JOIN!!!! (Kurosawa Shinobu)
Kannagi no Mori (Nishina Nao)
Quiz Magical Academy (Mysterious Black Mage)
Yoake no Bel Canto (Astoria Bragium, Aunaus Ryuusu)
Dash! (Lucas)
DYNAMIC CHORD feat.apple-polisher V edition (Kurosawa Shinobu)
Dekiai voice drama × Berry's Danshi (Takabata Ibuki)
Puzzle Cafe (Hiruma Seiki)
Koutetsujou no Kabaneri -ran- (Chihiro)
Tlicolity eyes (Mochizuki Yousuke)
Ikemen Sengoku Toki o kakeru Koi -Aratanaru Deai- (Takeda Shingen)
Alchemia Story (Shizu) (Collaboration Event with Kino's Journey)
Eternal Dungeon (Hijikata Toshizo
Danmachi ~Memoria Friese~ (Shizu) (Collaboration Event with Kino's Journey)
Shinen Resist (Volker)
Meiji Tokyo Renka -Haikara Date- (Ozaki Kouyou)
Ayakashi Koi Mekuri (Gin'No Jou)
Ordinal Strata (Reinhardt)
Octopath Traveler (Cyrus Albright)
Black Clover : Quartet Knight (Mars)
Seikimatsu Days: Our Era's End (Toya Isui, Kusanagi Goshou)
23/7 (George A. Custer)
World End Heroes (Raijo Shigure)
Valkyrie Anatomia: The Origin (Goblin Slayer) (Collaboration Event with Goblin Slayer)

2019
ZENONZARD (Ash Claude)
BROWNDUST (Aaron)
Dragon Marked For Death (Warrior)
Kingdom Hearts III (Ira)
Criminal Girls X (Male Protagonist)
DRAGALIA LOST (Prometheus)
Caligula -OVERDOSE- (Nintendo Switch Edition) (Izuru Minezawa)
RELEASE THE SPYCE secret fragrance (Mrs. Chocolatier)
Grand Summoners (Goblin Slayer : Collaboration Event with Goblin Slayer), (Vox)
Tlicolity Eyes -twinkle showtime- (Mochizuki Yousuke)
Dear My Magical Boys (Nintendo Switch Edition) (Niki Mugendo)
Libra of Precatus (Claudio)
Graffiti Smash (Calm)
Toraware no Palm (Nintendo Switch Edition) (Haruto Kisaragi)
Ken Ga Toki (Shakushain)
Palette Parade (El Greco)
Gensou Kissa Enchanté (Canus Espada)
War of the Visions: Final Fantasy Brave Exvius (Sterne Leonis)
Gensou Maneji (Serge)
Sakura Wars (Xiaolong Yang)
Gunvolt Chronicles: Luminous Avenger iX (Dystnine)
Disney Twisted Wonderland (Leona Kingscholar)
Kaikan♥Phrase -CLIMAX- (Noah Walker)
Kannagi no Mori Satsuki Ame Tsuzuri (Nishina Nao)
The King of Fighters '98 (Goblin Slayer : Collarboration Event with Goblin Slayer)
Goblin Slayer -THE ENDLESS REVENGE- (Goblin Slayer)

2020
Birushana Senki ~Genpei Hikamu Sou~ (Musashibou Benkei)
Wind Boys (Hanashiro Seriya)
Digimon ReArise (Hackmon)
Ensemble Stars!! Basic/Music (Keito Hasumi)
Disney: Twisted-Wonderland (Leona Kingscholar)
I★Chu Étoile Stage (Lucas)
Bleach: Brave Souls (Jugram Haschwalt)
JACKJEANNE (Einishi Rokurou)
Hyakka Ryouran Sengoku Star (Tenkabito)
Miya no Kei -Palace Trick- (Emperor Bo Hokukou)
OVERLORD: MASS FOR THE DEAD (Ryuuguuin Seiya : Collaboration event with Cautious Hero)
World Flipper (Educeus)
Kingdom of Heroes Season 2 : The Broken King (Osric)
Touken Ranbu (Ochidori Jyumonjiyari)
Mitra Sphere (Prince voice)
Genshin Impact (Al-Haitham)

2021
Monster Hunter Rise (Merchant Kagero)
Meiji Restoration Tensho Keru Koi (Ōkubo Toshimichi)
Valkyrie Connect (Takamimusubi, Savior Dis)
London Labyrinth (Globley)
Octopath Traveler: Champions of the Continent (Cyrus)
Nekopara - Catboys Paradise (Sage)
Three Kingdoms Heroes, Three Kingdoms RPG (Hua Xiong, Gan Ning, Taishi Ci)
The IDOLM@STER SideM GROWING STARS (Kyoji Takajo)
Deep Insanity: Asylum (Wu Innominatus)
Fire Emblem Heroes (Raven)
The Legend of Heroes: Kuro no Kiseki (Kasim Al-Fayed)
My Next Life as a Villainess: All Routes Lead to Doom! ~The Pirate Who Summons Trouble~ (Albert)
Code Geass: Genesic Re;Code (Hijikata Tochizou)
Tarot Boys: 22 Apprentice Fortune Tellers (Ein Baphomet)
Dragon Quest X (Hakuou)
Ragnador: Ayashiki Koutei to Shuuen no Yashahime (Ginko)
Pokémon Masters EX (Darach)
Tales of Luminaria (August Wallenstein)

2022
Birushana Senki ~Ichijuu no Kaze~ (Musashibou Benkei)Sentimental Photography (Saijou Mamoru)Radiant Tale (Paschalia)Shironeko Golf (Liam)Gran Saga (Kaito)Dream Meister and the Recollected Black Fairy (Kuchen)Shadowverse (Magna Zero)Soukaitenki (Reiji)Genshin Impact (Alhaitham)JoJo's Bizarre Adventure: Last Survivor (Weather Report)LAST CHOUDIA (Thouzer)Majestic☆Majolical [Nintendo Switch] (Jasper Beryl)Shikōtei no michi e: Shichiyū no arasoi (Lord Xinling)WORLD II WORLD (Col)Eternal Tree (Hakuro)ALICE Fiction (Lex)JoJo's Bizarre Adventure: All Star Battle R (Weather Report)

2023Master Detective Archives: Rain Code (Vivia Twilight)Radiant Tale: Fanfare! (Paschalia)Tower of Sky (Anker)
Alchemy Stars (Leyn)
DUEL MASTERS PLAY'S (Shuramaru)

 Drama CD 

2014Exit Tunes Present Actors2 (Kiriyama)GANGSTA. (Subordinate)Mawazaka no Kenshi to Shoukan Maou (Loki)Nozomubeku mo Nai (Friend A)

2015FlyMEproject "MEDICODE (Semimaru)Zenryoku Shounen Tachi no O-ut (Toa Sakuraba)

2017Goblin Slayer (Goblin Slayer)

2018Blossom (Kiritani Yamato)Koiiro Shihyou -Sweet Days- (Tokitsu Kaname)

2021High Card (Vijay Kumar Singh) 

BLCD
2015Ai no Mitsu ni Yoe! (Dormitory Student)

Vomic
2014My Hero Academia (Katsuki Bakugō)

Stage
2015Hoshi no Koe (2015) (Terao Noboru)

2017Homunculus (2017) (Julius)

2018Eraser in My Head 11th letter (Stage Edition)(2018) (Kousuke)

2019Chévere Note ~Story from Jeanne d'Arc~ (2019) (Étienne de Vignolles)

2020EL GALLEON (2020) (William Dampier)
THANATOS (2020) (Dr. Edmund Earhart)
VOICARION (Noguchi Tamon)

 Film 
2020
Seiyuu Danshi Desu Ga...? (Himself)

CM
2015MAMESHIBA GAKUEN (Midori Edao)

Dubbing
Live-actionDMZ (Skel)A Dog's Purpose (Teenage Ethan Montgomery)Goosebumps (Zach Cooper)School of Rock (Freddie) (episode 1 and 2 and then return from episode 12 onwards)Spiral (Detective William Schenk)Unforgotten (Tyler Da Silva)Valley of the Boom (Marc Andreessen)

AnimationBravest Warriors (Daniel "Danny" Vasquez)Love, Death & Robots (Sale man) (Episode 12)Miraculous Ladybug'' (Luka Couffaine)

References

External links
Official Profile at ArtsVision

 

1991 births
Living people
21st-century Japanese male actors
Japanese male video game actors
Japanese male voice actors
Male voice actors from Shizuoka Prefecture
Seiyu Award winners
Arts Vision voice actors